Pallikoodam or Ezhuthupally Pally is a word in Malayalam and Tamil that denotes a school.
These were mostly village schools run by individual teachers (Ezhuthu pally Aashaans or Asans or Gurus) and were distinct from Kalaris that taught martial arts.

Etymology
The real meaning of Pallikkoodam is a sacred place for education. In medieval Kerala, Jain Derasars and Buddhist viharas were known as 'Ezhuthupally Pally. When Budha bhiskhus started small schools, they were called Pallikkoodam. A generally accepted explanation of the etymology of this Malayalam word is that it is a blend word formed out of two Malayalam words Palli and Koodam and that this originated from the centuries-old Buddhist practice. The word Palli usually denotes respect. Palliunarthal referring to respectable word to describe the morning awakening of a king. Pallurakkam, is another word which commence with the same sound "palli" respectable word to express a King's sleep. It is not known from when the word "palli" started using in the language though but it denotes the respect attached to the word. Malayalam word for "Church / Mosque" is also later referred to as "Palli". 

Wherever existed, Buddhists missionaries were active in spreading literacy and education across . The Buddhist monasteries, known as the Viharas were turned into educational institutes as the demand went high for Buddhist teachings, These were called ‘Palli’ in Kerala. Ezhuthupalli, that were run later near Hindu temples are considered to be school legacy of Viharas.

The schools that were set up near to the temples were called as Ezhuthupalli.

Even now the schools in Kerala are called as Pallikoodam in Malayalam. In Sri Lankan Tamil, too, the word Pallikkoodam is used.

Also said that it is used by the Malankara Syrian Church in Kerala to run a school along with (Malayalam word: കൂടെ, Transliteration: Koode) each and every major church (Malayalam word: പള്ളി, Transliteration: Palli) of the locality.

Types

There were different forms of Pallikoodams that were established across Kerala offering different levels of education, with some regional variations. Kudippallikoodam was by far the most important, popular and wide spread form, since most of the students except clerics, priests or scholarly professionals would usually stop after receiving elementary education and start working on their professions.

Kudippallikoodam

Kudippallikoodam (കുടിപ്പള്ളിക്കൂടം) also known as 'Aashan Pallikoodam' (ആശാൻ പള്ളിക്കൂടം) was a popular form of schooling. This was an indigenous elementary schooling method where an instructor or aashan (ആശാൻ) would teach young children about alphabets,  numbers, elementary arithmetic, writing as well as general aspects of life such as personal discipline, cleanliness, morality and general knowledge. Young students are initially trained in writing by making them write on the sand. 
Once they are comfortable with writing on sand, the students would upgrade themselves to reporting on the standard writing medium i.e. palm leaves (Thaliyola or Palm-leaf manuscripts) as the writing material and iron pen (Narayam) as the writing instrument (stylus) to scribe on them.

In the 20th century CE, the writing medium mostly got upgraded into wooden slates and chalk. This continued to be the case until the system almost entirely died out by the dawn of the 21st century CE.

Revival Efforts
Recent efforts have been undertaken to revive traditional teaching methods and tools. A noteworthy example is an initiative titled Malayalam Pallikoodam proposed by the famous Malayalam Poet V Madhusoodanan Nair. This initiative tried to revive the use of wooden slates instead of paper notebooks and pencils for teaching Malayalam and has received significant attention from parents.

See also
 Education in Kerala
 Institute of Human Resources Development
 List of educational institutions in Kerala
 Narayam, the writing instrument used to write on palm leaf-based documents.
 Palm-leaf manuscript

References
"The Buddhist History of Kerala". kerala.cc. Retrieved 4 April 2016. Link:

Education in Kerala
Malayalam terms
Schools in Kerala
Tamil